3851 Alhambra, provisional designation , is a stony Flora asteroid and relatively slow rotator from the inner regions of the asteroid belt, approximately 7 kilometers in diameter. It was discovered on 30 October 1986, by Japanese astronomer Tsutomu Seki at Geisei Observatory in Kōchi, Japan. The asteroid was named for the World Heritage Site Alhambra, in Granada, Spain.

Orbit and classification 

The S-type asteroid is a member of the Flora family, one of the largest groups of stony asteroids in the main-belt. It orbits the Sun in the inner main-belt at a distance of 2.0–2.3 AU once every 3 years and 3 months (1,171 days). Its orbit has an eccentricity of 0.06 and an inclination of 5° with respect to the ecliptic. The first precovery was taken at La Plata Astronomical Observatory in 1950, extending the asteroid's observation arc by 36 years prior to its discovery.

Physical characteristics 

A rotational lightcurve of Alhambra was obtained from photometric observations made at the Australian Hunters Hill Observatory in March 2007. It rendered a long rotation period of 53 hours with a brightness amplitude of 0.35 in magnitude. While not being a slow rotator, Alhambras period is much longer than that of most asteroids.

According to the survey carried out by the NEOWISE mission of NASA's space-based Wide-field Infrared Survey Explorer, Alhambra measures 6.5 and 6.8 kilometers in diameter and its surface has an albedo of 0.218 and 0.242, respectively, while the Collaborative Asteroid Lightcurve Link assumes an albedo of 0.24 – derived from 8 Flora, the largest member and namesake of this orbital family – and calculates a diameter of 6.5 kilometers with an absolute magnitude of 13.1.

Naming 

This minor planet was named for the Alhambra ("the red one"), the famous medieval palace and fortress complex of the Moorish emirs, located in Granada, Andalusia, Spain. The place with its Islamic architecture is now a UNESCO World Heritage Site and one of Spain's major tourist attractions. The virtuoso classical guitarist Andrés Segovia, after whom the minor planet 3822 Segovia is named, had the piece Recuerdos de la Alhambra (Memories of the Alhambra) in his repertoire. The official naming citation was published by the Minor Planet Center on 21 April 1989.

References

External links 
 Asteroid Lightcurve Database (LCDB), query form (info )
 Dictionary of Minor Planet Names, Google books
 Asteroids and comets rotation curves, CdR – Observatoire de Genève, Raoul Behrend
 Discovery Circumstances: Numbered Minor Planets (1)-(5000) – Minor Planet Center
 
 

003851
Discoveries by Tsutomu Seki
Named minor planets
19861030